Sporthalle Gießen-Ost is an indoor sporting arena located in Gießen, Germany. The gym was built in the 1960s both as the gym of a nearby high school as well as the gym for the city's professional basketball team, the Giessen 46ers. In 2006, the arena was renovated and holds now a capacity of 4,003 people.

References 

Indoor arenas in Germany
Basketball venues in Germany
Giessen
Sports venues in Hesse
1960s establishments in West Germany